star-world, StarWorld, Starworld, Star world, or variant, may refer to:

 Star World, Hong Kong-based English-language TV network
 Star World India, TV network
 Star World Premiere, TV network
 Star World Philippines, TV network
 Starworld, apparel brand
 star world, star-world navigation in robotics
 Star World Championships or Star Worlds, sailing world championships for the Star-class
 Starworld (1981 novel), novel by Harry Harrison in the To the Stars (trilogy)
 Starworld Casino, casino located in the Malaysian hotel First World Hotel
 Exoplanet, "star world" in poetic language
 Twelve Colonies, location in Battlestar Galactica elliptically referred to as the Star World.

See also
 WorldStar, hiphop vlog